Gabriel Bourque (born September 23, 1990) is a Canadian professional ice hockey forward who is currently under contract with the Laval Rocket of the American Hockey League (AHL). He was selected by the Nashville Predators in the fifth round (132nd overall) of the 2009 NHL Entry Draft.

Playing career

Early career
As a youth, Bourque played in the 2003 Quebec International Pee-Wee Hockey Tournament with the Baie-Comeau Petit Drakkar minor ice hockey team.

Bourque began his major junior ice hockey career with the Baie-Comeau Drakkar during the 2007–08 season. Bourque was selected in the fifth round, 132nd overall by the Nashville Predators during the 2009 NHL Entry Draft. In his final season of junior, Bourque was traded to the Moncton Wildcats on December 19, 2009. The Wildcats won the President's Cup by defeating the Saint John Sea Dogs in six games. Bourque was awarded the Guy Lafleur Trophy as playoff MVP, where he recorded 19 goals and 29 points.

Professional career

Nashville Predators
On April 15, 2010, the Predators signed Bourque to a three-year, entry level contract. Bourque spent his first professional season with the Predators' American Hockey League affiliate, the Milwaukee Admirals.

Bourque played his first NHL game on December 28, 2011 against the Minnesota Wild and scored his first NHL career goal on January 5, 2012 against the Dallas Stars. On April 11, 2012, Bourque scored his first NHL Stanley Cup playoffs goal when the Predators beat the Detroit Red Wings in Game 1 of the Western Conference Quarter-Finals. In his fifth season within the Predators organization in 2015–16, Bourque was limited to just 22 games due to illness and injury.

Colorado Avalanche
As a restricted free agent, Bourque was not tendered a qualifying offer to remain in Nashville, releasing him to free agency.

Unable to attain an NHL contract over the off-season, Bourque agreed to attend the Colorado Avalanche training camp on a professional try-out contract on September 1, 2016.  After a successful training camp and preseason, Bourque agreed to a contract with the Avalanche in signing a one-year, two-way deal on October 10, 2016. Bourque spent the majority of the season with the San Antonio Rampage of the AHL, scoring 33 points in 61 games.

On July 18, 2017, the Avalanche re-signed Bourque to a one-year extension. Bourque played 58 games for the Avalanche, recording 11 points. Bourque also scored two goals in six games during the 2018 Stanley Cup playoffs.

On May 24, 2018, the Avalanche re-signed Bourque to a one-year, $950,000 extension.

Winnipeg Jets
On August 26, 2019, Bourque signed a one-year, two-way contract with the Winnipeg Jets. In the 2019–20 season, Bourque made the opening night roster for the Jets out of training camp, and in a fourth-line specialist role made 52 appearances, in collecting 2 goals and 6 points. With the season paused due to the COVID-19 pandemic, Bourque made 3 playoff appearances in a qualifying round defeat to the Calgary Flames.

Later years
As a free agent from the Jets, Bourque was without a club for the entirety of the pandemic delayed 2020–21 season. He returned to the professional ranks, in securing a one-year AHL contract with home provincial club, the Laval Rocket, affiliate to the Montreal Canadiens on June 12, 2021.

On July 17, 2022, Bourque was re-signed by the Rocket to a one-year contract extension.

Career statistics

Regular season and playoffs

International

Awards and honours

References

External links
 

1990 births
Living people
Baie-Comeau Drakkar players
Canadian ice hockey forwards
Colorado Avalanche players
Ice hockey people from Quebec
Laval Rocket players
Milwaukee Admirals players
Moncton Wildcats players
Nashville Predators draft picks
Nashville Predators players
People from Rimouski
San Antonio Rampage players
Winnipeg Jets players